Michael Batty is a footballer who played as a centre half in the Football League for Manchester City.

References

1944 births
Living people
Footballers from Manchester
Association football central defenders
English footballers
Manchester City F.C. players
Rhyl F.C. players
Mossley A.F.C. players
English Football League players